Mario Fioretti (born ) is an Italian professional basketball coach, who is currently an assistant coach of Olimpia Milano of the LBA and the EuroLeague.

Coaching career
After graduating, he traveled to America wherein he became an assistant coach to Bobby Knight, the head coach of the Indiana Hoosiers. He stayed there for a year. After that, he went back to Italy and became an assistant coach for the Olimpia Milano in 2004 under head coach Attilio Caja. Since then, he has become a vital part of the team's coaching staff.

Youth coaching career
Fioretti is also an assistant coach for several youth teams in Bergamo since 2003.

Personal life
Mario Fioretti was born in Bergamo, in the Lombardy Region of Northern Italy. He graduated with a degree in Economics at University of Bergamo in 1999.

References

External links
 at EuroBasket.com
 at olimpiamilano.com

1973 births
Living people
Italian basketball coaches
Italian expatriate basketball people in the United States
Sportspeople from Bergamo